The term gluteome is used to describe the entire set of all gluten-like proteins in grains, which consumption causes occurrence of clinical manifestations in celiac patients. These proteins include gliadins and glutenins from wheat, secalins from rye, hordeins from barley, avenins from oats and potentially homologues from other related grain species. Since not all grain storage proteins have been identified yet, the term gluteome often refers to the complete set of the known sequences of gluten and gluten-like molecules.

Alternatively, the word gluteome can depict the entire complement of grain-storage proteins in a single grain species at a given time.

The discipline of science dedicated to study gluteome is referred to as gluteomics.

Gluten